Native Community Lands (acronym: TCO; also translated as Communal Lands of Origin), according to Bolivian law, are territories held by indigenous people through collective title. The creation of these territories has been a major goal of Bolivian indigenous movements and a political initiative pursued by both neoliberal and indigenous-identified national governments. TCOs are being included under the Indigenous Originary Campesino Autonomy regime. , 60 TCOs had been proposed in the lowlands, of which 12 had completed titling, and 143 had been proposed in the highlands, of which 72 had final titles. More than 16.8 million hectares have been incorporated within Native Community Lands , more than 15% of Bolivia's land area.

Titling of indigenous territories was propelled by the March for Territory and Dignity in July and August 1990, organized by the Confederation of Indigenous Peoples of the Bolivian East (CIDOB). This march demanded the recognition of four indigenous territories, which was granted through Supreme Decrees issued on 24 September 1990. State recognition was formalized through the 1993 Agrarian Reform Law, which authorized community land ownership and formalized Native Community Lands as the vehicle for this ownership. Responsibility for verifying and awarding title fell to the National Institute of Agrarian Reform. In the 1994 revision of the Constitution, indigenous rights to exercise "social, economic, and cultural rights" through Native Community Lands were recognized in Article 171. In the 2009 Constitution, Native Community Lands reappear as Indigenous Originary Campesino Territories in Article 403. A study by the Fundación Tierra found that while the Morales government has significantly advanced titling of Native Community Lands, it has resisted ensuring the constitution rights of TCO residents over the management of their territories and resources.

Notes

links
List and maps of TCO in 2000

Indigenous politics in South America
Indigenous peoples in Bolivia
Indigenous topics of the Gran Chaco